Jadranka Chaushevska Dimov (born 1968) is a Macedonian diplomat who served as the Ambassador Extraordinary and Plenipotentiary to France and later Permanent Delegate of North Macedonia to the United Nations Educational, Scientific and Cultural Organization (UNESCO).

Education 
Dimov was educated at Saints Cyril and Methodius University in Skopje where she graduated with a degree in French Language and Literature.

Career 
Dimov started her diplomatic career in the Department of European Affairs at the Ministry of Foreign Affairs of North Macedonia as a Junior Associate in 1995 before being posted to Paris for her first diplomatic mission as Second Secretary and promoted to the position of First Secretary and Permanent Delegation to UNESCO in 2000. Following her return to the Ministry of Foreign Affairs of Macedonia in 2001, she was appointed as Assistant Head of the Analytics and Research Sector until 2007, and later became the Head of the Security and Informatics Sector. She served as Minister Adviser at Macedonia embassy in Bulgaria from 2008 to 2012. She was appointed Macedonia ambassador to France in August 2018 and Permanent Delegate to UNESCO in 2019.

Reference 

Macedonian diplomats
Macedonian women diplomats
Permanent Delegates of North Macedonia to UNESCO
Living people
1968 births
Ambassadors of North Macedonia to France